Rose Varghese is an educator and was the Vice Chancellor of National University of Advanced Legal Studies, Kochi.

Education
 Graduated in Law,  Kerala Law Academy Law College, Thiruvananthapuram
 Post Graduation in Law from the School of Legal Studies, Cochin University of Science and Technology
 M. Phil in Law, National Law School of India University, Bangalore
 Ph. D.  Faculty of Law, University of Delhi

Career
 1976, practice as an attorney at the High Court of Kerala. 
 1985 Lecturer in Law, A.C. College of Law, Nagarjuna University.
 1988  Assistant Professor,  National Law School of India University, Bangalore  
 1994 Associate Professor, Faculty of Law, Jamia Millia Islamia Central University, New Delhi, subsequently Professor and then  Dean of the Faculty

References

External links
 National University of Advanced Legal Studies

Living people
Delhi University alumni
Indian barristers
Women educators from Kerala
Educators from Kerala
Scholars from Kochi
20th-century Indian lawyers
Year of birth missing (living people)
20th-century Indian women lawyers
Indian legal scholars